Tagbilaran City is politically subdivided into 15 barangays.

The city is part of the 1st legislative district of the Province of Bohol.

As of 2015, 12 barangays are classified as urban barangays where 93,011 (88.54%) of Tagbilaran City's population lives, while the remaining 3 rural barangays are home to 12,040 residents, representing 11.46% of the total population.

Cogon is the most populous barangay in the city with a population of 17,750 while Cabawan is the least populous barangay with only 1,734 residents. Bool recorded a 17.45% increase in population, the highest in the city while Poblacion III decreased 2.94% in terms of population.

List of Barangays

References

Tagbilaran
Tagbilaran City